Luis Flores (born 27 October 1967) is a Honduran athlete. He competed in the men's triple jump at the 1992 Summer Olympics.

References

1967 births
Living people
Athletes (track and field) at the 1992 Summer Olympics
Honduran male triple jumpers
Olympic athletes of Honduras
Place of birth missing (living people)
Central American Games bronze medalists for Honduras
Central American Games medalists in athletics